is a Japanese anthology manga written by Kaiu Shirai and illustrated by Posuka Demizu. It was published by Shueisha in September 2021. It features six standalone pieces of short stories published between 2016 and 2021.

Publication
Kaiu Shirai x Posuka Demizu: Beyond The Promised Neverland features six one-shot stories written by Kaiu Shirai and illustrated by Posuka Demizu: , launched on Februay 18, 2016, on Shōnen Jump+. , published in Weekly Shōnen Jump on August 2, 2021; The collection included a previously unpublished one-shot specially drawn for the book titled , and the  epilogue chapter for The Promised Neverland; the epilogue manga was first featured at an art exhibition for the franchise in Tokyo and was previously unpublished in any volume.

Shueisha released the collected tankōbon volume on September 3, 2021.

It was published on November 8, 2022 in North America by Viz Media.

Chapter list

Reception
Author Masaki Tsuji enjoyed and prised the one-shot stories of the volume, in particularly the Spirit Photographer Saburo Kono chapter which he described as "a splendid composition". Tsuji was impressed by the breadth and depth of the base of human resources of the story.

Anime News Network gave it a 4 out of 5, and described the volume as "Each one shot is self-contained enough and combined, the volume does cover a variety of different stories with some more favorably leaning towards science fiction. Despite any differences in character or direction though, each chapter has this inexplicable charm and heart to it. The fact that Kaiu Shirai manages to cheat towards the end of the book and find a creative way to sort of connect all of the one shots together did not even phase me because for what is extensively a collection of random short stories, such a trick definitely felt earned".

The french website Manga News gave it a 15/20, and stated "these different stories turn out to be well-camped and, above all, sublimated by Posuka Demizu's immediately recognizable visual touch, which loses nothing of its sets and designs hiding lots of small details. This collection is therefore quite pleasant to follow as a whole. The stories imagined by Shirai, are well paced and rich in some good twists and subjects, while Demizu excels once again in their abundant and moving images". Lucie Ancion from the french website ActuaLitté praised the creativity and imagination of the duo, she also highlighted the themes of the short stories, writing "a new planet on which humans are a minority, a world where ghosts roam until they find rest, a society where artificial intelligence has become widespread, another where anarchy leaves no room for anything but violence. Each of the 4 main stories depicts a different universe, like a springboard to propel the genius to write the adventure as much as the emotion of Shirai and the exceptional pen of Demizu. This Collection of Short Stories is teeming with creativity, it is an ode to friendship, brotherly love, generosity and devotion, agitated by eventful adventures and against a backdrop of sublime scenery. But it is also an opportunity to see how far the exceptional creative alchemy of this iconic duo of authors can go".

Further reading

References

External links
  at Viz Media
 

2021 manga
Fantasy anime and manga
Manga anthologies
Science fiction anime and manga
Shōnen manga
Shueisha manga
Thriller anime and manga
Viz Media manga